Mutiny  is a 1928 Soviet war drama film directed by Semyon Tymoshenko based on the novel of the same name by Dmitry Furmanov.

Plot
Central Asia during the Civil War. The Jarkent battalion of the Red Army, located in the   Verny (now   Alma-Ata), receives an order from Frunze to go to the Fergana region to fight the Basmachi. A group of kulaks, with the support of local merchants and beys, incites the unconscious, wavering mass of the Red Army to revolt. The anti-Soviet agitation of counter-revolutionaries, demagogically exploiting the mood of war weariness, provokes an open mutiny in the battalion.

Cast
 Pyotr Podvalny as Mikhail Frunze
 Aleksey Alekseev as Dmitry Furmanov
 Tatyana Guretskaya as  Naya Furmanova
 Boris Babochkin as Karavaev
 Pyotr Kirillov as partisan Eryskin
 Valery Solovtsov as Vinchetsky
 Nikolay Zimenko as Shegabutdinov

Critical response 
Film critic Mikhail Bleiman  observed:
Working with a benevolent viewer in mind does not educate him, but only excites him for a second. This primitive method was used to make Mutiny. It is made with the expectation of constant reaction, guaranteed applause.

That is why the film did not like the filmmakers who watched the  work, and liked the Red Army men who watched the  events  for the first time.

References

External links 
 
 Mutiny on KinoPoisk 

1928 films
Films based on Russian novels
Soviet black-and-white films
Soviet war drama films
Russian Civil War films
Films set in Russia
1928 drama films
1920s war drama films
1920s Russian-language films